The Lo Nuestro Award for Tropical Traditional Performance is an honor presented annually by American network Univision. The Lo Nuestro Awards were first awarded in 1989 and has been given annually since to recognize the most talented performers of Latin music. The nominees and winners were originally selected by a voting poll conducted among program directors of Spanish-language radio stations in the United States and also based on chart performance on Billboard Latin music charts, with the results being tabulated and certified by the accounting firm Deloitte. At the present time, the winners are selected by the audience through an online survey. The trophy awarded is shaped in the form of a treble clef. The award name was changed in 2013 to Lo Nuestro Award for Tropical Contemporary Artist of the Year.

The award was first presented to Colombian singer-songwriter Carlos Vives in 2001. American band Aventura holds the record for the most awards with six, and most nominations with eight. Dominican singer Andy Andy and Colombian performer Fonseca are the most nominated performer without a win, with four unsuccessful nominations each.

Winners and nominees
Listed below are the winners and nominees of the award for each year.

Multiple wins/nominations

See also
 Grammy Award for Best Traditional Tropical Latin Album
 Latin Grammy Award for Best Contemporary Tropical Album

References

Tropical Contemporary Artist of the Year
Tropical musicians
Awards established in 2001